Rubus segnis is an uncommon North American species of flowering plant in the rose family. It grows in eastern Canada (all 3 Maritime Provinces) and the northeastern United States (Maine, New Hampshire, Vermont, Massachusetts). Nowhere is it very common.

The genetics of Rubus is extremely complex, so that it is difficult to decide on which groups should be recognized as species. There are many rare species with limited ranges such as this. Further study is suggested to clarify the taxonomy. Some studies have suggested that R. segnis may have originated as a hybrid between R. flagellaris and R. hispidus.

References

segnis
Plants described in 1941
Flora of the Northeastern United States
Flora of Canada
Flora without expected TNC conservation status